The Bacchini are a tribe of hoverflies.

List of genera 
Argentinomyia Lynch Arribalzaga, 1891
Baccha Fabricius, 1805
Leucopodella Hull, 1949
Melanostoma Schiner, 1860
Platycheirus Lepeletier & Serville, 1828
Rohdendorfia Smirnov, 1924
Spazigaster Rondani, 1843
Syrphocheilosia Stackelberg, 1864
Talahua Fluke, 1945
Tuberculanostoma Fluke, 1943
Xanthandrus Verrall, 1901

References 

Syrphinae
Brachycera tribes